Fire in the Mountains is an Indian drama film directed and written by Ajitpal Singh in his directorial debut. The film stars Vinamrata Rai, Chandan Bisht, Harshita Tiwari and Mayank Singh Jaira.

The film had its world premiere at the 2021 Sundance Film Festival on 31 January 2021.

Cast
The cast includes:
 Vinamrata Rai as Chandra
 Chandan Bisht as Dharam
 Harshita Tiwari as Kanchan
 Mayank Singh Jaira as Prakash
 Sunil Tewari as Various Characters

Release
The film has its world premiere at the 2021 Sundance Film Festival on 31 January 2021 in the World Cinema Dramatic Competition section.

Reception
The review aggregator website Rotten Tomatoes surveyed  and, categorizing the reviews as positive or negative, assessed 8 as positive and 0 as negative for a 100% rating. Among the reviews, it determined an average rating of 6.7 out of 10.

References

External links
 
 

Indian independent films
Indian drama films
2021 independent films
2021 drama films